Aldo Longinotti (27 December 1909 – 30 August 1986) was an Italian boxer. He competed in the men's middleweight event at the 1932 Summer Olympics. At the 1932 Summer Olympics, he lost to Amado Azar of Argentina.

References

External links
 

1909 births
1986 deaths
Italian male boxers
Olympic boxers of Italy
Boxers at the 1932 Summer Olympics
Sportspeople from the Province of Piacenza
Middleweight boxers
20th-century Italian people